Habibia High School is a school in Kabul, Afghanistan which has educated many of the former and current Afghan elite, including President Ashraf Ghani and musician Ahmad Zahir. It was founded by King Habibullah Khan in 1903 and is considered one of the oldest Schools In Afghanistan. It is situated in the south of the city in a district known as Karteh Seh.

Over 18,000 students are studying in three different shifts. The undergraduate enrollment is approximately 2000 students.

History 

It suffered severe damage during the civil war of the 1990s between the different mujahideen factions who had ousted the communist government of Mohammad Najibullah in 1992.

The Indian government funded the rebuilding of the school in 2003, it committed $5 million for the restoration project. The restoration was completed in two years and the school was reopened in August 2005, by Afghan President Hamid Karzai and Indian Prime Minister  Dr. Manmohan Singh.

In November 2021, a powerful magnetic roadside bomb exploded near the school.

Notable alumni 
 Ashraf Ghani, former president of Afghanistan
 Hamid Karzai, former president of Afghanistan
 Mohammad Hashim Maiwandwal, former Prime Minister of Afghanistan
 Mohammad Gul Khan Momand, former Home Minister of Afghanistan
 Sibghatullah Mojaddedi, former President of Afghanistan
 Mohammad Najibullah, former President of Afghanistan
 Dr. Sayed Makhdoom Raheen, former Minister of Information and Culture
 Mohammed Zahir Shah, former king of Afghanistan
 Abdul Rahim Wardak, former Defence Minister of Afghanistan
 Ahmad Zahir, legendary Afghan musician
 Dr. Hafiz Sahar, former President and Chief Editor, Daily Eslah and Kabul University professor of Journalism
 Wasef Bakhtari, prominent Afghan poet, writer, and literary figure
 Mohammad Ghous Bashiri, Afghan politician

Notable faculty 
 Faiz Mohammad Katib Hazara, historian
 Richard N. Frye, Aga Khan Professor Emeritus of Iranian Studies at Harvard University

See also 
 List of schools in Kabul
 List of schools in Afghanistan

References 

 
Schools in Kabul
Educational institutions established in 1903
1903 establishments in Afghanistan